Estero de Castro is a 20 km long inlet of the Sea of Chiloé into Chiloé Island. Castro, the capital of Chiloé Province is located on its western shores.

Bodies of water of Los Lagos Region
Inlets of Chile
Estuaries of Chile